is a Japanese former competitive figure skater who is now a coach and International Skating Union (ISU) official. She is a five-time Japanese national champion and represented Japan twice at the Winter Olympics, in 1960 and 1964. She was the flag bearer for Japan at the 1960 Winter Olympics.

Hiramatsu is an ISU Referee and ISU technical controller for Japan. She took the Judge's Oath for the 1998 Winter Olympics in Nagano.

Results

References

External links

Interview

1942 births
Living people
Figure skaters at the 1960 Winter Olympics
Figure skaters at the 1964 Winter Olympics
Japanese female single skaters
Olympic figure skaters of Japan
Figure skating officials
Olympic officials
Sportspeople from Hyōgo Prefecture
Universiade medalists in figure skating
Oath takers at the Olympic Games
Universiade gold medalists for Japan
Universiade silver medalists for Japan
Competitors at the 1962 Winter Universiade
Competitors at the 1964 Winter Universiade